List of St Patrick's Athletic F.C. seasons.

Seasons

1 Deducted 15 points for fielding ineligible players.

Key

Division shown in bold when it changes due to promotion or relegation. Top scorers shown in bold are players who finished the season as top scorer of their division. 

Key to league record:
P = Played
W = Games won
D = Games drawn
L = Games lost
F = Goals for
A = Goals against
Pts = Points
Pos = Final position

Key to divisions:
Premier = LOI Premier Division
First = LOI First Division

Key to rounds:
DNQ = Did not qualify
QR = Qualifying Round
PR = Preliminary Round
R1 = First Round
R2 = Second Round
R3 = Third Round
R4 = Fourth Round
R5 = Fifth Round

Grp = Group Stage
QF = Quarter-finals
SF = Semi-finals
RU = Runners-up
W = Winners

 
St Patrick's Athletic